Sentani or Buyaka is a Papuan language of West Papua. It is spoken in about 30 scattered villages. Dialects are East, West, and Central (Ethnologue).

Phonology

Consonants

Vowels

Central Sentani
Central Sentani phonology from Foley (2018):Foley's (2018) classification is:

Citations

References

External links 
Written materials for Sentani are available through Kaipuleohone

Languages of western New Guinea
Sentani languages